Scotinotylus evansi is a species of sheet weaver found in the Palearctic. It was described by O.P.-Cambridge in 1894.

References

Linyphiidae
Spiders described in 1894
Spiders of Europe
Palearctic spiders